Let It Loose may refer to:
 "Let It Loose" (Rolling Stones song), 1972
 "Let It Loose" (Chris Rea song), 1983
 Let It Loose (album), a 1987 album by Gloria Estefan and the Miami Sound Machine